Joe Jakub (born 7 December 1956, in Falkirk, Scotland) is a Scottish former professional footballer who played as a defender and midfielder for  Burnley, Bury, AZ Alkmaar, Chester City and Wigan Athletic.

Playing career
Joe's career centred mainly around Burnley. He joined the Turf Moor outfit as a youth player during the summer of 1972 and spent the majority of his career at the club in two spells. He played in all four divisions of the English professional league system for the Clarets and was a regular in their side when they won the final Football League Fourth Division championship in 1991–92.

He also enjoyed a six-year stint with Bury from 1980 to 1986 that was followed by spells with Dutch side AZ Alkmaar, two separate seasons at Chester City (also working as a youth coach in his second spell at the club), Wigan Athletic, Preston North End (without making any league appearances) and North Wales non–league side Colwyn Bay.

Since retiring from the game, Joe is now working in a journalistic capacity in football for the Press Association and has also done some scouting for Preston North End in North Wales.

Honours

Bury

1984–85: Football League Fourth Division promotion as fourth placed team (40 apps, 3 goals)

Burnley

1991–92: Football League Fourth Division champions (39 apps)

Chester City

1993–94: Football League Third Division runners–up (36 apps)

References

1956 births
Living people
Scottish footballers
Burnley F.C. players
Bury F.C. players
Chester City F.C. players
Colwyn Bay F.C. players
Wigan Athletic F.C. players
Preston North End F.C. players
English Football League players
AZ Alkmaar players
Stockport County F.C. non-playing staff
Chester City F.C. non-playing staff
Preston North End F.C. non-playing staff
Footballers from Falkirk
Association football fullbacks
Association football midfielders
Scottish expatriate footballers